Bukit Batok Secondary School is a co-educational government secondary school in Bukit Batok, Singapore.

History
Bukit Batok Secondary School was first opened in 1986, housed in a S$8.2 million campus at the junction of Bukit Batok West Avenues 3 and 8. In 1988, air-conditioners were installed in the school's library, language lab and computer room. On 9 April that year, the school was officially opened by Chai Chong Yii, Member of Parliament for Bukit Batok SMC.

From 2006 to 2008, the school was rebuilt for S$25.48 million under the PRIME scheme. School Advisory Committee members and parents raised another S$661,220 in two years for non-standard items such as an air-conditioned multi-purpose hall and a viewing gallery for the Indoor Sports Hall.

References

External links
 Bukit Batok Secondary School
 Society for Science

Secondary schools in Singapore